The 1989 Railway Cup Hurling Championship was the 63rd staging of the Railway Cup since its establishment by the Gaelic Athletic Association in 1927. The cup began on 7 October 1989 and ended on 8 October 1989.

Leinster were the defending champions, however, they were beaten by Connacht in the semi-final.

On 8 October 1989, Connacht won the cup after a 4-16 to 3-17 defeat of Munster in the final at Wexford Park. This was their 7th Railway Cup title overall and their first title since 1987.

Results

Semi-finals

Shield final

Final

Scoring statistics

Top scorers overall

Bibliography

 Donegan, Des, The Complete Handbook of Gaelic Games (DBA Publications Limited, 2005).

References

Railway Cup Hurling Championship
Railway Cup Hurling Championship
Hurling